This is a list of the Lycaenidae of Europe. It is a part of List of the butterflies of Europe.

Subfamily Aphnaeinae
Tawny silverline, Cigaritis acamas (Klug, 1834)

Subfamily Lycaeninae
Tribe Lycaenini
Small copper, Lycaena phlaeas (Linnaeus, 1761)
Large copper, Lycaena dispar (Haworth, 1802)
Violet copper Lycaena helle Denis & Schiffermüller, 1775
Lycaena ottomanus (Lefèbvre, 1830)
Scarce copper, Lycaena virgaureae (Linnaeus, 1758)
Sooty copper, Lycaena tityrus (Poda, 1761)
Iberian sooty copper, Lycaena bleusei Oberthur, 1884   
Purple-shot copper, Lycaena alciphron (Rottemburg, 1775)
Purple-edged copper, Lycaena hippothoe (Linnaeus, 1761)
Balkan copper, Lycaena candens (Herrich-Schäffer, [1844])   
Lesser fiery copper, Lycaena thersamon (Esper, 1784)
Golden copper, Lycaena thetis Klug 1834

Subfamily Polyommatinae
Tribe Polyommatini
Nordic blue, Agriades aquilo (Boisduval, 1832)   
Bosnian blue, Agriades dardanus (Freyer, 1844)   
Arctic blue, Agriades glandon (de Prunner, 1798) 
Cranberry blue, Agriades optilete (Knoch, 1781) 
Alpine argus, Agriades orbitulus (de Prunner, 1798) 
Gavarnie blue, Agriades pyrenaicus (Boisduval, 1840)   
Brown argus, Aricia agestis (Denis & Schiffermuller 1775)
Blue argus, Aricia anteros (Freyer, 1838)
Northern brown argus, Aricia artaxerxes (Fabricius, 1793)
Southern brown argus, Aricia cramera Eschscholtz, 1821
Mountain argus, Aricia montensis Verity, 1928     
Spanish argus, Aricia morronensis (Ribbe, 1910)
Silvery argus, Aricia nicias (Meigen, 1830)
Topaz-spotted blue, Azanus jesous (Guérin-Méneville, 1847) 
Velvet-spotted blue, Azanus ubaldus (Stoll, 1782) 
Geranium bronze, Cacyreus marshalli Butler, 1898 
Holly blue, Celastrina argiolus (Linnaeus, 1758) 
Provençal short-tailed blue, Cupido alcetas (Hoffmansegg, 1804) 
Short-tailed blue, Cupido argiades (Pallas, 1771) 
Eastern short-tailed blue, Cupido decolorata (Staudinger, 1886)   
Lorquin's blue, Cupido lorquinii (Herrich-Schäffer, 1847) 
Small blue, Cupido minimus (Fuessly, 1775) 
Osiris blue, Cupido osiris (Meigen, 1829) 
Carswell's little blue, Cupido carswelli Stempffer, 1927
Mazarine blue, Cyaniris semiargus (Rottemburg, 1775) 
Geranium argus, Eumedonia eumedon (Esper 1780)
Grass jewel, Freyeria trochylus (Freyer, 1845) 
Glabroculus cyane (Eversmann, 1837)   
Green-underside blue, Glaucopsyche alexis (Poda, 1761) 
Black-eyed blue, Glaucopsyche melanops (Boisduval, 1828) 
Paphos blue, Glaucopsyche paphos Chapman, 1920   
Iolas blue, Iolana iolas (Ochsenheimer, 1816) 
Eastern brown argus, Kretania eurypilus (Freyer, 1851)     
Spanish zephyr blue, Kretania hesperica (Rambur, 1840) 
Cretan argus, Kretania psylorita (Freyer, 1845)    
Zephyr blue, Kretania pylaon (Fischer von Waldheim, 1832) 
Zephyr blue, Kretania sephirus (Frivaldzky, 1835)   
Alpine zephyr blue, Kretania trappi (Verity, 1927)
Long-tailed blue, Lampides boeticus (Linnaeus, 1767) 
Lang's short-tailed blue, Leptotes pirithous (Linnaeus, 1767) 
Canary blue, Leptotes webbianus (Brullé, 1839) 
Persian grass blue, Luthrodes galba (Lederer, 1855) 
Spanish chalk-hill blue, Lysandra albicans (Gerhard, 1851) 
Adonis blue, Lysandra bellargus (Rottemburg, 1775) 
Azure chalkhill blue, Lysandra caelestissima (Vérity, 1921)   
Chalkhill blue, Lysandra coridon (Poda, 1761) 
False chalkhill blue, Lysandra corydonius (Herrich-Schäffer, 1852) 
Lysandra gennargenti Leigheb, 1987
Provence chalk-hill blue, Lysandra hispana (Herrich-Schäffer, 1852) 
Lysandra nufrellensis Schurian, 1977
Pontic blue, Neolysandra coelestina (Eversmann, 1843)      
Alcon blue, Phengaris alcon (Denis & Schiffermüller, 1775) 
Large blue, Phengaris arion (Linnaeus, 1758) 
Dusky large blue, Phengaris nausithous (Bergsträsser, 1779) 
Scarce large blue, Phengaris teleius (Bergsträsser, 1779) 
Large jewel blue, Plebejidea loewii (Zeller, 1847)   
Silver-studded blue, Plebejus argus (Linnaeus, 1758) 
Reverdin's blue, Plebejus argyrognomon (Bergsträsser, 1779) 
Bellier's Blue, Plebejus bellieri (Oberthür, 1910)   
Idas blue, Plebejus idas (Linnaeus, 1761) 
Anomalous blue, Polyommatus admetus (Esper, 1783) 
Amanda's blue, Polyommatus amandus (Schneider, 1792) 
Grecian anomalous blue, Polyommatus aroaniensis (Brown, 1976) 
Polyommatus celina (Austaut, 1879)
Polyommatus damocles (Herrich-Schäffer, 1844) European Russia    
Damon blue, Polyommatus damon (Denis & Schiffermüller, 1775) 
Polyommatus damone (Eversmann, 1841) Ukraine, Russia   
Meleager's blue, Polyommatus daphnis (Denis & Schiffermüller, 1775) 
Furry blue, Polyommatus dolus (Hübner, 1823) 
Turquoise blue, Polyommatus dorylas (Denis & Schiffermüller, 1775) 
Eros blue, Polyommatus eros (Ochsenheimer, 1808) 
Escher's blue, Polyommatus escheri (Hübner, 1823) 
Oberthür’s anomalous blue, Polyommatus fabressei (Oberthür, 1910)   
Catalonian furry blue, Polyommatus fulgens (De Sagarra, 1925) 
Sierra Nevada blue, Polyommatus golgus (Hübner, 1813) 
Piedmont anomalous blue, Polyommatus humedasae Toso & Balletto, 1976 
Common blue, Polyommatus icarus (Rottemburg, 1775) 
Chelmos blue, Polyommatus iphigenia (Herrich-Schäffer, 1847)   
Anatolian white-blue, Polyommatus menalcas (Freyer, 1837)   
Higgins’s anomalous blue, Polyommatus nephohiptamenos (Brown & Coutsis, 1978)   
Mother-of-pearl blue, Polyommatus nivescens Keferstein, 1851 
Kolev's anomalous blue, Polyommatus orphicus Kolev, 2005   
Ripart's anomalous blue, Polyommatus ripartii (Freyer, 1830) 
Chapman's blue, Polyommatus thersites (Cantener, 1835) 
Polyommatus timfristos Lukhtanov, Vishnevskaya & Shapoval, 2016 
Andalusian anomalous blue, Polyommatus violetae (Gómez-Bustillo, Expósito & Martínez, 1979) 
Sardinian blue, Pseudophilotes barbagiae De Prins & van der Poorten, 1982  
False baton blue, Pseudophilotes abencerragus (Pierret, 1837)
Baton blue, Pseudophilotes baton (Bergsträsser, 1779)
Bavius blue, Pseudophilotes bavius (Eversmann, 1832)
Panoptes blue, Pseudophilotes panoptes (Hübner, 1813)
Eastern baton blue, Pseudophilotes vicrama (Moore, 1865)
Chequered blue, Scolitantides orion (Pallas, 1771)
Balkan Pierrot, Tarucus balkanica (Freyer, 1844)
Common tiger blue, Tarucus theophrastus (Fabricius, 1793)
Fischer's blue, Tongeia fischeri (Eversmann, 1843)
Turanana taygetica (Rebel, 1902)
Dark grass blue, Zizeeria karsandra (Moore, 1865)
African grass blue, Zizeeria knysna (Trimen, 1862)

Subfamily Theclinae
Tribe Eumaeini
Chapman's green hairstreak, Callophrys avis Chapman, 1909
Sovinsky's green hairstreak, Callophrys chalybeitincta , Sovinsky, 1905 Russia 
Alpine green hairstreak, Callophrys suaveola (Staudinger, 1881) Russia 
Green hairstreak, Callophrys rubi (Linnaeus, 1758)
Neolycaena rhymnus (Eversmann, 1832)
Sloe hairstreak, Satyrium acaciae (Fabricius, 1787)
False ilex hairstreak, Satyrium esculi (Hübner, 1804)
Ilex hairstreak, Satyrium ilicis (Esper, 1779)
Satyrium ledereri (Boisduval, 1848)
Black hairstreak, Satyrium pruni (Linnaeus, 1758)
Blue spot hairstreak, Satyrium spini (Denis & Schiffermuller, 1775)
White-letter hairstreak, Satyrium w-album (Knoch, 1782) 
Tribe Theclini 
Purple hairstreak, Favonius quercus (Linnaeus, 1758)
Spanish purple hairstreak, Laeosopis roboris (Esper, 1789)
Brown hairstreak, Thecla betulae (Linnaeus, 1758)
Tribe Tomarini
Provence hairstreak, Tomares ballus Fabricius, 1787
Caucasian vernal copper, Tomares callimachus (Eversmann, 1848)
Nogel's hairstreak, Tomares nogelii (Herrich-Schäffer, 1851)

References

Higgins, L.G. & Riley, N.D. A Field Guide to the Butterflies of Britain and Europe. Collins 
Tshikolovets, V.V. Butterflies of Europe and Mediterranean Area. Tshikolovets, Kiev 

 
Europe, Lycaenidae